J. Wilson was an English footballer who played in the Football League for Wolverhampton Wanderers.

References

Date of birth unknown
Date of death unknown
English footballers
Association football defenders
English Football League players
Wolverhampton Wanderers F.C. players